This is a list of poets portraying sexual relations between women, who may include both lesbians and other WSW. The major poetic works depicting relationship among women are shown next to the respective poet's name in italics. One very important body of such work is the poetry of Sappho of Lesbos.

Poets and their works
 Adrienne Rich - Twenty-one Love Poems; Dream of a Common Language
 Amy Lowell - Picture of the Floating World; Two Speak Together
 Anis Gisele - 
 Anna de Noailles - Love Poem; Book of My Life
 Audre Lorde - Cables to Rage, Martha
 Becky Birtha - The Forbidden Poems
 Carol Ann Duffy - Feminine Gospels; Love Poems
 Cherríe Moraga - La Guera
 Chrystos - In Her I Am
 Edna St Vincent Millay - Women Have Loved Before as I Love Now; What Lips My Lips Have Kissed
 Eileen Myles - Sappho's Boat; Irony of the Leash
 Elizabeth Bishop - North and South
 Ellen Bass - Mules of Love
 Gertrude Stein - Three Sisters Who Are Not Sisters
 H.D. (Hilda Doolittle) - Hymen
 Jane Eaton Hamilton - Body Rain; Love Will Burst into a Thousand Shapes
 Judy Grahn - She Who; Love Belongs to Those Who Do the Feeling
 Kamala Das - The Descendants
 Kay Ryan - Erratic Facts
 Marilyn Hacker - Hang Glider's Daughter; Love, Death and Changing Seasons
 Mary Dorcey - Noise from the Woodshed
 Mary Oliver - Thirst; Night Traveler; Sleeping in the Forest
 May Swenson - Another Animal
 Mercedes de Acosta - Moods; Streets and Shadows; Archways of Life
 Michael Field - Works and Days (love diary); Poems of Adoration 
 Michelle Tea - Rent Girl; Rose of No Man's Land; Passionate Mistake and Intricate Corruption of One Girl in America
 Monique Wittig - Women Warriors (a novel)
 Natalie Clifford Barney - Other Alliances; Indiscreet Souvenirs
 Nella Nobili -  Les femmes et l'amour homosexuel
 Otep Shamaya - Little Sins
 Pat Parker - Child of Myself
 Renée Vivien - A Woman Appeared to Me
 Rita Mae Brown - Songs to a Handsome Woman; Venus Envy
 Robin Becker - All American Girl
 Sappho - Ode to Aphrodite
 Sarah Pinder - Cutting Room
 Sophia Parnok - Roses of Pieria
 Stephanie Dering
 Tapan Kumar Pradhan - Three Women in One
 Taslima Nasrin - Game of the Girls; Hunger in the Roots

Lesbian periodicals, journals and literary magazines
See List of Lesbian Periodicals, Journals and Magazines, Past and Present

History and criticism
 Lesbianism in Germany: 1890s to 1920s. Lillian Faderman and Brigitte Eriksson.
 Passions Between Women: British Lesbian Culture 1668–1801. Emma Donoghue
 Odd Girls and Twilight Lovers: A History of Lesbian Life in Twentieth-Century America. Lillian Faderman
 Lesbian Texts and Contexts: Radical Revisions, ed. Karla Jay and Joanne Glasgow, New York University Press 1990
 The Literature of Lesbianism, ed. Terry Castle, Columbia University Press 2003

Awards for lesbian literature
 Golden Crown Literary Society
 Lambda Literary Award
  Awards from the Publishing Triangle
 Gaylactic Spectrum Award (GLBT science fiction, fantasy and horror)
 Ferro-Grumley Literary Prize

See also

List of lesbian fiction

Sexual relations between women
Lesbian literature
Poets
Poets
Lists of poets